Pteroprista is a monotypic moth genus of the family Erebidae. Its only species, Pteroprista metallica, is found in Brazil. Both the genus and the species were first described by Warren in 1889.

References

Herminiinae
Monotypic moth genera